Sri Lanka is a tropical island situated close to the southern tip of India. The invertebrate fauna is as large as it is common to other regions of the world. There are about 2 million species of arthropods found in the world, and still it is counting. So many new species are discover up to this time also. So it is very complicated and difficult to summarize the exact number of species found within a certain region.

This a list of the pteridophytes found from Sri Lanka.

Pteridophytes
Pteridophytes are vascular plants which reproduce by spores. These free sporing vascular plants show a remarkable life cycle with independent gametophyte and sporophyte generations. Pteridophytes are composed of ferns and lycophytes. Ferns consist of stems, leaves and roots. The stem is usually referred to as rhizome, which is sometimes underground in nature. Most species show stolons and few are with semi-woody trunks. Leaves are referred to as a frond. New leaves typically expand by the unrolling of a tight spiral, the phenomenon known as circinate vernation. There are about 10,560 known species of ferns in the world.

Lycopods are belong to the division Lycopodiophyta, and some are homosporous while others are heterosporous. They differ from ferns due to presence of microphylls, which are the leaves that have only a single vascular trace. There are two extant classes of lycopods, which contains a total of 12 genera and 1290 known species.

The earliest notes on pteridophyte diversity of Sri Lanka dated back to 1887 with Baker's Handbook to the Fern Allies and then in 1892 with Beddome's Handbook to the Ferns of British India, Ceylon, and the Malay Peninsula. In 1947, Copeland adopted a taxonomical system to describe modern taxa of pteridophytes of Sri Lanka. Based on these publications, Prof. R.N. de Fonseka and Mr. M.A.B Jansen prepared the checklist of the pteidophytes of Sri Lanka in 1978. Since then, many experiments and research were carried out about particular families which are important to economy.

The following article is based on the checklist by Fonseka and Jansen in 1978.

Division Pteridophyta

Class Equisetopsida

Order Equisetales

Family Equisetaceae - Horsetails
 Equisetum debile

Class Marattiopsida

Order Marattiales

Family Marattiaceae
 Angiopteris evecta
 Marattia fraxinea

Order Ophioglossales

Family Ophioglossaceae - Adder's-tongue ferns
 Botrychium daucifolium
 Botrychium lanuginosum
 Helminthostachys zeylanica
 Ophioglossum gramineum
 Ophioglossum pedunculosum
 Ophioglossum pendulum
 Ophioglossum petiolatum
 Ophioglossum reticulatum

Class Polypodiopsida

Order Cyatheales

Family Cyatheaceae - Scaly tree ferns
 Cyathea crinita
 Cyathea gigantea
 Cyathea hookeri
 Cyathea sinuata
 Cyathea srilankensis
 Cyathea walkerae

Order Gleicheniales

Family Gleicheniaceae - Forked ferns
 Dicranopteris linearis

Order Hymenophyllales

Family Hymenophyllaceae - Bristle ferns

 Hymenophyllum denticulatum
 Hymenophyllum gardneri
 Hymenophyllum javanicum
 Hymenophyllum macriglossum
 Hymenophyllum polyanthos
 Trichomanes bilabiatum
 Trichomanes bimarginatum
 Trichomanes exiguum
 Trichomanes intramarginale
 Trichomanes kurzii
 Trichomanes motleyi
 Trichomanes nitidulum
 Trichomanes obscurum
 Trichomanes pallidum
 Trichomanes plicatum
 Trichomanes proliferum
 Trichomanes saxifragoides
 Trichomanes wallii

Order Osmundales

Family Osmundaceae - Flowering ferns
 Osmunda javanica

Order Polypodiales

Family Athyriaceae

 Anisocampium cumingianum
 Athyrium anisopterum
 Athyrium hohenackeranum
 Athyrium macrocarpon
 Athyrium nigripes
 Athyrium praetermissum - var. erythrorachis, tripinnatum
 Athyrium solenopteris - var. pusillum
 Deparia boryana
 Diplazium beddomei
 Diplazium cognatum
 Diplazium decurrens
 Diplazium dilatatum
 Diplazium esculentum
 Diplazium lasiopteris
 Diplazium muricatum
 Diplazium paradoxum
 Diplazium polyrhizon
 Diplazium procumbens
 Diplazium subsinuatum
 Diplazium sylvaticum
 Diplazium travancoricum
 Diplazium zeylanicum

Family Aspleniaceae - Spleenworts

 Asplenium aethiopicum
 Asplenium affines
 Asplenium cheilosorum
 Asplenium decorum
 Asplenium decrescens
 Asplenium disjunctum
 Asplenium ensiforme
 Asplenium erectum
 Asplenium falcatum
 Asplenium formosum
 Asplenium gardneri
 Asplenium indicum
 Asplenium inaequilaterale
 Asplenium longipes
 Asplenium nidus
 Asplenium nitidum
 Asplenium normale
 Asplenium obscurum
 Asplenium pellucidum
 Asplenium serricula
 Asplenium tenuifolium
 Asplenium tenerum
 Asplenium unilaterale
 Asplenium varians
 Asplenium zenkeranum

Family Blechnaceae
 Blechnum occidentale
 Blechnum orientale
 Blechnum patersonii
 Doodia dives
 Stenochlaena aculeata
 Stenochlaena palustris

Family Cystopteridaceae
 Cystopteris fragilis
 Cystopteris tenuiseta

Family Davalliaceae
 Araiostegia hymenophylloides
 Araiostegia pulchra
 Davallia denticulata
 Davallia trichomanoides
 Humata repens
 Humata vestita

Family Dennstaedtiaceae
 Dennstaedtia scabra
 Histiopteris incisa
 Hypolepis punctata
 Microlepia firma
 Microlepia majuscula
 Microlepia platyphylla
 Microlepia speluncae
 Microlepia strigosa
 Microlepia trapeziformis
 Pteridium aquilinum

Family Diplaziopsidaceae
 Diplaziopsis javanica

Family Dryopteridaceae - Wood ferns

 Arachniodes amabilis
 Arachniodes aristata
 Arachniodes tripinnata
 Bolbitis bradfordi
 Bolbitis mollis
 Bolbitis subcrenata
 Bolbitis virens
 Ctenitis ferruginea var. obtusiloba
 Ctenitis rhodolepis
 Dryopteris approximata
 Dryopteris ambigua
 Dryopteris deparioides subsp. concinna
 Dryopteris hirtipes
 Dryopteris gracillima var. prolongata, triangularis
 Dryopteris obtusissima
 Dryopteris pulvinulifera
 Dryopteris sparsa
 Dryopteris wallichiana
 Elaphoglossum angulatum
 Elaphoglossum ceylanicum
 Elaphoglossum commutatum
 Elaphoglossum spatulatum
 Egenolfia appendiculata
 Lastreopsis rufescens
 Lastreopsis tenera
 Peranema aspidioides
 Polystichum anomalum
 Polystichum auriculatum
 Polystichum biaristatum
 Polystichum setiferum var. nigropaleaceum
 Polystichum tacticopterum
 Polystichum walkerae var. bipinnatum

Family Hypodematiaceae
 Hypodematium crenatum

Family Lindsaeaceae
 Lindsaea caudata
 Lindsaea cultrata
 Lindsaea decomposita
 Lindsaea ensifolia
 Lindsaea heterophylla
 Lindsaea macraeana
 Lindsaea lancea
 Lindsaea orbiculata
 Lindsaea tenera
 Lindsaea walkerae - syn. Isoloma walkerae
 Sphenomeris chusana

Family Nephrolepidaceae - Swordferns
 Nephrolepis biserrata
 Nephrolepis cordifolia
 Nephrolepis exaltata
 Nephrolepis falcata
 Nephrolepis hirsutula

Family Oleandraceae
 Oleandra musifolia

Family Polypodiaceae - Polypod ferns

 Belvisia mucronata
 Belvisia revoluta
 Bosmania membranacea (syn. Microsorum membranaceum)
 Calymmodon cucullatus
 Ctenopteris glandulosa
 Ctenopteris mooltonii
 Ctenopteris repandula
 Ctenopteris subfalcata
 Ctenopteris thwaitesii
 Drymoglossum heterophyllum
 Drynaria quercifolia
 Drynaria sparsisora
 Grammitis attenuata
 Grammitis medialis
 Grammitis reinwardtii
 Grammitis wallii
 Grammitis zeylanica
 Leptochilus decurrens
 Leptochilus matallicus
 Leptochilus thwaitesianus
 Leptochilus wallii
 Loxogramme involuta
 Loxogramme parallela
 Microsorum dilatatum
 Microsorum nigrescens
 Microsorum punctatum
 Microsorum pteropus
 Microsorum scolopendria
 Pleopeltis amarurolepida
 Pleopeltis macrocarpa
 Pleopeltis nuda
 Prosaptia alata
 Prosaptia contigua
 Prosaptia khasyana
 Prosaptia obliquata
 Pyrrosia ceylanica
 Pyrrosia gardneri
 Pyrrosia lanceolata
 Pyrrosia mollis
 Pyrrosia pannosa
 Scleroglossum sulcatum
 Selliguea montanus
 Xiphopteris cornigera

Family Pteridaceae

 Acrostichum aureum
 Actiniopteris australia
 Adiantum capillus-veneris
 Adiantum caudatum
 Adiantum concinnum
 Adiantum diaphanum
 Adiantum flabellulatum
 Adiantum formosum
 Adiantum hispidulum
 Adiantum latifolium
 Adiantum philippense
 Adiantum poiretii
 Adiantum pulverulentum
 Adiantum raddianum
 Adiantum trapeziforme
 Adiantum zollingeri
 Aleuritopteris farinosa
 Anogramma leptophylla
 Antrophyum plantagineum
 Antrophyum reticulatum
 Ceratopteris thalictroides
 Cheilanthes mysorensis
 Cheilanthes thwaitesii
 Cheilanthes tenuifolia
 Coniogramme fraxinea
 Doryopteris concolor
 Hemionitis arifolia
 Pellaea boivini
 Pellaea falcata
 Pityrogramma calomelanos
 Pityrogramma chrysophylla
 Pteris biaurita
 Pteris cretica
 Pteris endiformis
 Pteris gardneri
 Pteris hookerana
 Pteris longipes
 Pteris quadriaurita var. ludens
 Pteris tripartita
 Pteris vittata
 Taenitis blechnoides
 Vaginularia paradoxa
 Vittaria elongata
 Vittaria flexuosa
 Vittaria scolopendrina

Family Tectariaceae
 Arthropteris obliterata
 Pteridrys syrmatica
 Pteridrys zeylanica
 Tectaria coadunata
 Tectaria decurrens
 Tectaria devexa
 Tectaria paradoxa
 Tectaria polymorpha
 Tectaria subtriphylla
 Tectaria thwaitesii
 Tectaria trimenii
 Tectaria zeilanica

Family Thelypteridaceae

 Ampelopteris prolifera
 Cyclosorus arbuscula
 Cyclosorus dentatus
 Cyclosorus extensus
 Cyclosorus gongyiodes var. glabrus, hirsutus
 Cyclosorus interruptus
 Cyclosorus jaculosus
 Cyclosorus latipinna
 Cyclosorus megaphyllus
 Cyclosorus papilio
 Cyclosorus parasiticus
 Cyclosorus penangianus
 Cyclosorus repandulus
 Cyclosorus subpubescens
 Cyclosorus thwaitesii
 Cyclosorus triphyllus
 Cyclosorus truncatus
 Cyclosorus unitus
 Cyclosorus urophyllus
 Stegnogramma mollissima - syn. Leptogramma mollissima
 Stegnogramma aspidioides
 Thelypteris beddomei
 Thelypteris brunnea
 Thelypteris ciliata
 Thelypteris flaccida
 Thelypteris uliginosa
 Thelypteris xylodes

Order Salviniales

Family Marsileaceae  Pepperworts
 Marsilea minuta
 Marsilea quadrifolia

Family Salviniaceae - Salvinias
 Azolla pinnata
 Salvinia molesta

Order Schizaeales

Family Lygodiaceae - Climbing ferns
 Lygodium circinnatum
 Lygodium flexuosum
 Lygodium japonicum
 Lygodium microphyllum

Family Schizaeaceae
 Schizaea dichotoma
 Schizaea digitata

Class Psilotopsida

Order Psilotales

Family Psilotaceae - Whisk ferns
 Psilotum nudum

Division Lycopodiophyta

Class Isoetopsida

Order Selaginellales

Family Selaginellaceae - Spike mosses
 Selaginella brachystachya
 Selaginella calostachya
 Selaginella ciliaris
 Selaginella cochleata
 Selaginella crassipes
 Selaginella intermedia
 Selaginella involvens
 Selaginella ornithopodioides
 Selaginella praetermissa
 Selaginella tenera
 Selaginella wightii

Order Isoetales

Family Isoetaceae - Quillworts
 Isoetes coromandeliana

Class Lycopodiopsida

Order Lycopodiales

Family Lycopodiaceae - Clubmosses
 Lycopodium carolinianum
 Lycopodium cernuum
 Lycopodium ceylanicum
 Lycopodium clavatum
 Lycopodium complnataum
 Lycopodium hamiltonii
 Lycopodium phlegmaria
 Lycopodium pulcherrimum
 Lycopodium squarrosum
 Lycopodium serratum
 Lycopodium wightianum

References

External links

 
pteridophytes